The following is a list of notable missionary schools founded in Turkey, during the Ottoman Empire. The schools listed are either closed or currently following a secular education model, according to the Constitution of Turkey, which outlaws religious education.

American Schools

 Euphrates College in Harput (1852)
 Robert College of Istanbul (1863)
 Talas American College in Talas, Kayseri (1871)
 Central Turkey College in Gaziantep (1874)
 Üsküdar American Academy in Istanbul (1876) (former American Academy for Girls)
 American Collegiate Institute, Izmir (1878)
 Adana American College for Girls (1880)
 Anatolia College in Merzifon, Amasya (1886)
 Tarsus American College, Mersin (1888)(former St. Paul's College in Tarsus)
 International College in Izmir (1891)

Austrian Schools
 St. George's Austrian High School in Istanbul (1882)

German Schools
 Deutsche Schule Istanbul in Istanbul (1868)

French Schools
 Lycée Français Notre Dame de Sion, Istanbul (1856)
 Lycée Français Saint Joseph d'Istanbul, (1870)
 Lycée Français Saint-Michel, Istanbul (1886)
 Lycée Français Sainte-Euphémie, Istanbul (1895)
 Lycée Français Sainte Pulchérie, Istanbul (1846)
 Lycée Saint Benoît d'Istanbul (1783)
 Lycée Saint-Joseph d'Izmir (1880)

Italian Schools
 Liceo Scientifico Italiano I.M.I., Istanbul, (1861)
 Liceo Scientifico Galileo Galilei, Istanbul (1870)

References
This article uses information from :tr:Osmanlı'da misyonerlik (Turkish Wikipedia article on missionaries during Ottoman Empire).

See also
 Education in Turkey
 Secularism in Turkey

List of high schools in Turkey
Education in Turkey

Lists of schools in Turkey
Turkey